Saraymağara, historically and still informally called Romanlı, is a village in the Yavuzeli District, Gaziantep Province, Turkey. The village is inhabited by Kurds of the Reşwan tribe.

References

Villages in Yavuzeli District
Kurdish settlements in Gaziantep Province